Rudnikovo is a rural locality (a village) in Yenangskoye Rural Settlement, Kichmengsko-Gorodetsky District, Vologda Oblast, Russia. The population was 50 as of 2002.

Geography 
Rudnikovo is located 50 km east of Kichmengsky Gorodok (the district's administrative centre) by road. Nizhny Yenangsk is the nearest rural locality.

References 

Rural localities in Kichmengsko-Gorodetsky District